Parmotrema alectoronicum is a species of saxicolous lichen in the family Parmeliaceae that was introduced as new to science in 2002. The margins of the lobes have cilia that are up to 1.5 mm long. The specific epithet alectoronicum refers to the presence of alectoronic acid in the medulla. This presence of this compound, as well as usnic acid in its cortex, is a rare combination in the genus Parmotrema.

See also
List of Parmotrema species

References

alectoronicum
Lichen species
Lichens described in 2002
Lichens of Brazil